Bishop Carlos Marcio Camus Larenas (14 January 1927 – 16 March 2014) emeritus (retired) bishop of the Linares, Chile and human rights advocate. He was a proponent of excommunication for those guilty of torture.

Born in Valparaíso, on 14 January 1927, he was ordained a priest on 21 September 1957. Camus was then appointed Bishop of Copiapó, Chile on 31 January 1968 and was ordained bishop on 3 March 1968. He was then appointed Bishop of Linares, Chile on 11 December 1976 and installed on 17 April 1977. He retired on 17 January 2003. He died on 16 March 2014.

References 

1927 births
2014 deaths
20th-century Roman Catholic bishops in Chile
21st-century Roman Catholic bishops in Chile
People from Valparaíso
Roman Catholic bishops of Copiapó
Roman Catholic bishops of Linares
Pontifical Catholic University of Valparaíso alumni